The 2015 Canadian Mixed Doubles Curling Trials were held from March 11 to 15 at the Ottawa Hunt and Golf Club in Ottawa, Ontario. The winning team of Charley Thomas and Kalynn Park will represent Canada at the 2015 World Mixed Doubles Curling Championship.

Teams
Twelve teams qualified through provincial and territorial championships, and the rest will be participating as open entries. The teams are listed as follows:

Provincial and Territorial champions

Open entries

Round-robin standings
Final round-robin standings

Playoffs

Round of 12
Saturday, March 14, 21:00

Quarterfinals
Sunday, March 15, 09:30

Semifinals
Sunday, March 15, 13:30

Final
Sunday, March 15, 17:30

References

External links

Canadian Mixed Doubles Curling Championship
Curling in Ottawa
Canadian Mixed Doubles Curling Trials
Canadian Mixed Doubles Curling Trials
2010s in Ottawa
Mixed Doubles Curling Trials